Dhian Singh Mand (born 3 May 1961)  is a Sikh politician who has been serving as the Sarbat Khalsa appointed acting jathedar of the Akal Takht since 2015 due to the imprisonment of its permanent jathedar Jagtar Singh Hawara.

Notes

References

1961 births
Living people
Punjabi politicians